The Sacred Union was a political truce in France in which the left-wing agreed, during World War I, not to oppose the government or call any strikes. Made in the name of patriotism, it stood in opposition to the pledge made by the French Section of the Workers' International (SFIO) internationalism, and its former leader Jean Jaurès, not to enter any "bourgeois war." Although an important part of the socialist movement joined the Union sacrée, some trade unionists such as Pierre Monatte opposed it.

On 3 August 1914, Germany declared war on France. The next day, Prime Minister Rene Viviani read an address written by the President of the French Republic, Raymond Poincaré:
 
("In the coming war, France will be heroically defended by all its sons, whose sacred union will not break in the face of the enemy").

This political movement may have been an attempt to create solidarity during a time when the largely pacifist French Socialist Party threatened a general strike, while many French Catholics felt slighted by a 1905 law separating church and state. Elements of nationalism, that the Germans attacked rather than the French, anti-German propaganda, and a desire to regain the former French territory of Alsace-Moselle may have provided further impetus for the movement.

See also 
 Burgfriedenspolitik, German equivalent
 União Sagrada, Portuguese equivalent
 Gerd Krumeich: Burgfrieden/Union sacrée, in: 1914-1918-online. International Encyclopedia of the First World War.

References 

France in World War I
Political history of France
World War I
French Third Republic